Peter Karlsson (born 11 August 1973) is a retired Swedish football midfielder.

References

1973 births
Living people
Swedish footballers
Örebro SK players
Association football midfielders
Allsvenskan players
Place of birth missing (living people)